Todd Collins may refer to:
 Todd Collins (linebacker) (born 1970), American football linebacker
 Todd Collins (quarterback) (born 1971), American football quarterback
 Todd Collins (producer), music producer and member of American band Peace of Mind

See also
 Tod Collins (1876–1942), Australian rules footballer
 Collins (surname)